This page lists notable table tennis events taking place in 2018.

World table tennis events

Senior
 February 22 – 25: 2018 ITTF Team World Cup in  London
 Men:  (Xu Xin, Ma Long, & Fan Zhendong)
 Women:  (Liu Shiwen, Ding Ning, & Zhu Yuling)
 April 29 – May 6: 2018 World Team Table Tennis Championships in  Halmstad
 Men:  (Fan Zhendong, Lin Gaoyuan, Ma Long, Wang Chuqin, & Xu Xin)
 Women:  (Chen Meng, Ding Ning, Liu Shiwen, Wang Manyu, & Zhu Yuling)
 September 28 – 30: 2018 ITTF Women's World Cup in  Chengdu
  Ding Ning defeated  Zhu Yuling, 4–0, to win her third World Cup title.
  Cheng I-ching took third place.
 October 19 – 21: 2018 ITTF Men's World Cup in  Paris
  Fan Zhendong defeated  Timo Boll, 4–1, to win his second World Cup title.
  Lin Gaoyuan took third place.

Junior and cadet
 October 23 – 31: 2018 World Cadet Challenge in  Tottori
 Cadet boys' singles:  ZENG Beixun
 Cadet girls' singles:  KUAI Man
 Cadet boys' doubles:  (Sora Matsushima & Yuma Tanigaki)
 Cadet girls' doubles:  (Honami Nakamori & Hikari Okubo)
 Cadet mixed doubles:  Iulian Chirita &  Yukari Sugasawa
 December 2–9: 2018 World Junior Table Tennis Championships in  Bendigo
 Junior boys' singles:  XU Haidong
 Junior girls' singles:  QIAN Tianyi
 Junior boys' doubles:  (XIANG Peng & XU Haidong)
 Junior girls' doubles:  (HUANG Fanzhen & SHI Xunyao)
 Junior mixed doubles:  (XU Yingbin & SHI Xunyao)

Continental table tennis championships

Africa (TT)

Senior
 March 1–3: 2018 ITTF African Cup in  Nairobi
 Men:  Omar Assar defeated  Quadri Aruna, to win his first ITTF African Cup title.
  Ahmed Saleh took third place.
 Women:  Dina Meshref defeated  Sarah Hanffou, to win her second ITTF African Cup title.
  Offiong Edem took third place.
 September 3–9: 2018 ITTF African Table Tennis Championships in  Port Louis
 Men's singles:  Quadri Aruna
 Women's singles:  Dina Meshref
 Men's doubles:  (Youssef Abdel-Aziz & Khalid Assar)
 Women's doubles:  (Farah Abdel-Aziz & Reem El-Eraky)
 Mixed doubles:  (Ahmed Saleh & Dina Meshref)
Junior and cadet
 March 24–25: 2018 Road to Buenos Aires 2018 YOG series - Africa in  Soliman
 Four players to compete in Buenos Aires 2018 YOG:  Yu Khinhang,  Amin Ahmadian,  Tatiana Kukulkova, &  Sabina Šurjan
 April 7–13: 2018 African Junior and Cadet Championships in  Abidjan

 Junior boys' singles:  Youssef Abdel-Aziz
 Junior girls' singles:  Marwa Al-Hodaby
 Junior boys' doubles:  (Youssef Abdel-Aziz & Marwan Abdelwahab)
 Junior girls' doubles:  (Farida Badawy & Sara El-Hakem)
 Mixed doubles:  (Youssef Abdel-Aziz & Marwa Al-Hodaby)

 Cadet boys' singles:  Mohamed Azzam
 Cadet girls' singles:  Hend Fathy

Americas (TT)

Senior
 March 4–8: 2018 Latin American Senior Championships in  Havana
 Men's singles:  Eric Jouti
 Women's singles:  Bruna Takahashi
 Men's doubles:  (Andy Pereira & Jorge Campos)
 Women's doubles:  (Paulina Vega & Judith Morales)
 Mixed doubles:  (Eric Jouti & Gui Lin)
 June 15–17: 2018 ITTF Pan-America Cup in  Asunción
 Men's singles:  Hugo Calderano
 Women's singles:  Zhang Mo
 November 20–25: 2018 Pan American Table Tennis Championships in  Santiago
 Men's singles:  Kanak Jha
 Women's singles:  Adriana Díaz
 Men's doubles:  (Vitor Ishiy & Eric Jouti)
 Women's doubles:  (Alicia Cote & Zhang Mo)
 Mixed doubles:  (Brian Afanador & Adriana Díaz)

Junior and cadet
 February 20–23: 2018 Central American U15/U18 in  San Salvador

 Junior boys' singles:  Diego Vazquez
 Junior girls' singles:  Clio Barcenas
 Junior boys' doubles:  (Gary Castro & Genaro Roustan)
 Junior girls' doubles:  (Lucia Cordero & Hidalynn Zapata)
 Junior Mixed doubles:  (Oscar Villalta & Keren Bolanos Constanza)

 Cadet boys' singles:  Jacobo Vahnish
 Cadet girls' singles:  Marbella Aceves
 Cadet boys' doubles:  (Sergio Carrillo & Diego de la Cruz)
 Cadet girls' doubles:  (Marbella Aceves & Arantxa Cossio)
 Cadet Mixed doubles:  (Sergio Carrillo & Mariana Lopez)

 March 21–25: 2018 South American U15/U18 in  Santiago

 Junior boys' singles:  Martin Bentancor
 Junior girls' singles:  Tamyres Fukase
 Junior boys' doubles:  (Nicolas Burgos & Andres Martinez)
 Junior girls' doubles:  (Tamyres Fukase & Livia Lima)
 Junior mixed doubles:  (Guilherme Teodoro & Livia Lima)

 Youth boys' singles:  Carlos Fernandez
 Youth girls' singles:  Giulia Takahashi
 Youth boys' doubles:  (Joel Cisneros & Carlos Fernandez)
 Youth girls' doubles:  (Giulia Takahashi & Laura Watanabe)
 Youth mixed doubles:  (Carlos Fernandez & Maria Maldonado)

 April 14–15: 2018 Road to Buenos Aires 2018 YOG series - Latin America in  Asunción
 Four players that have qualified to compete in Buenos Aires 2018 YOG:  Matteo Mutti,  Yanapong Panagitgun,  Jamila Laurenti, &  Goi Rui Xuan
 June 1–2: 2018 Road to Buenos Aires 2018 YOG series - North America in  Markham
 Four players that have qualified to compete in Buenos Aires 2018 YOG:  Kim Song Gun,  Cédric Meissner,  Pyon Song Gyong, &  Franziska Schreiner
 July 10–15: 2018 Pan American Junior Table Tennis Championships in  Santo Domingo
 Junior boys' singles:  Kanak Jha
 Junior girls' singles:  Adriana Diaz
 Junior boys' doubles:  (Sharon Alguetti & Kanak Jha)
 Junior girls' doubles:  (Rachel Sung & Rachel Yang)
 Junior mixed doubles:  (Sharon Alguetti & Crystal Wang)
 Junior boys' Team:  (Kanak Jha, Nikhil Kumar, Sharon Alguetti & Nikolas Tio)
 Junior girls' Team:  (Amy Wang, Crystal Wang, Rachel Sung & Rachel Yang)

Asia (TT)

Senior
 April 6–8: 2018 ITTF-ATTU Asian Cup in  Yokohama
 Winners:  Fan Zhendong (m) /  Zhu Yuling (f)

Junior and cadet
 May 7–8: 2018 Road to Buenos Aires 2018 YOG series - Asia in  Bangkok
 Four players qualified to compete at Buenos Aires 2018:  Javen Choong,  Manav Vikash Thakkar,  Choi Hae-eun, &  Andrea Pavlovic

Europe (TT)

Senior
 February 3–4: 2018 Europe Top 16 Cup in  Montreux
 Men:  Timo Boll defeated  Dimitrij Ovtcharov, 4–0 (13–11, 11–6, 11–3, 11–6), to win his sixth Europe Top 16 Cup title. 
  Jonathan Groth took third place.
 Women:  Bernadette Szőcs defeated  Li Jie, 4–1 (12–10, 8–11, 11–6, 11–5, 11–7), to win her first Europe Top 16 Cup title.
  Elizabeta Samara took third place.
 September 18–23: 2018 European Table Tennis Championships in  Alicante
 singles winners:  Timo Boll (m) /  Li Qian (f)
 doubles winners:  (Daniel Habesohn & Robert Gardos) (m) /  (Nina Mittelham & Kristin Lang) (f)
 Mixed doubles winners:  (Ruwen Filus & Han Ying)

U-21, Junior and cadet
 February 12–13: 2018 Road to Buenos Aires 2018 YOG series - Europe in  Hodonín
 Boys that qualified to compete in Buenos Aires 2018 YOG:  Bastian Rembert and  Cristian Pletea 
 Girls that qualified to compete in Buenos Aires 2018 YOG:  Andreea Dragoman and  Lee Ka Yee
 March 8–11: 2018 European Under-21 Table Tennis Championships in  Minsk
 Men's singles:  Tomas Polansky
 Women's singles:  Mariia Tailakova
 Men's doubles:  (Ibrahim Gündüz & Abdullah Yigenler)
 Women's doubles:  Solomiya Brateyko &  Natalia Bajor
 July 15–24: 2018 Table Tennis European Youth Championships in  Cluj-Napoca
 boys' singles:  Ioannis Sgouropoulos
 girls' singles:  Ning Jing
 boys' doubles:  (Lev Katsman & Maksim Grebnev)
 girls' doubles:  Anastasia Kolish &  Lucie Gauthier

Oceania (TT)

Senior
 March 15–19: 2018 Oceania Championships in  Gold Coast, Queensland
 Men's singles:  Chris Yan
 Women's singles:  Jian Fang Lay
 Men's doubles:  (Hu Heming & Chris Yan)
 Women's doubles:  (Michelle Bromley & Melissa Tapper)
 Mixed doubles:  (Chris Yan & Jian Fang Lay)
 May 18–19: 2018 ITTF-Oceania Cup in  Port Vila
 Men's singles:  Hu Heming
 Women's singles:  Jian Fang Lay

Junior and cadet
 June 1–2: 2018 ITTF-Oceania Junior Championships in  Rarotonga
 Junior boys' singles:  Benjamin Gould
 Junior girls' singles:  VONG Hui-Ling
 Cadet boys' singles:  Nathan Xu
 Cadet girls' singles:  ZHOU Jiayi
 June 8–9: 2018 Road to Buenos Aires 2018 YOG series - Oceania in  Rarotonga
 Qualified to compete in Buenos Aires 2018 YOG:  Pang Yew En Koen &  Archana Girish Kamath

2018 ITTF World Tour

World Tour Platinum events
 March 8 – 11: 2018 Qatar Open in  Doha
 Men's Singles:  Fan Zhendong
 Women's Singles:  Liu Shiwen
 Men's Doubles:  (Fan Zhendong & Xu Xin)
 Women's Doubles:  (CHEN Ke & Wang Manyu)
 March 23 – 25: 2018 German Open in  Bremen
 Men's Singles:  Ma Long
 Women's Singles:  Kasumi Ishikawa
 Men's Doubles:  (Ma Long & Xu Xin)
 Women's Doubles:  (Hina Hayata & Mima Ito)
 May 31 – June 3: 2018 China Open in  Shenzhen
 Men's Singles:  Ma Long
 Women's Singles:  Wang Manyu
 Men's Doubles:  (Fan Zhendong & Lin Gaoyuan)
 Women's Doubles:  (Ding Ning & Zhu Yuling)
 July 19 – 22: 2018 Korea Open in  Daejeon
 Men's Singles:  JANG Woo-jin
 Women's Singles:  Zhu Yuling
 Men's Doubles:  (JANG Woo-jin & LIM Jong-hoon)
 Women's Doubles:  (Chen Meng & Ding Ning)
 July 26 – 29: 2018 Australian Open in  Geelong
 Men's Singles:  Xu Xin
 Women's Singles:  Liu Shiwen
 Men's Doubles:  (Jung Young-sik & Lee Sang-su)
 Women's Doubles:  (Hina Hayata & Mima Ito)
 November 8 – 11: Austrian Open (final) in  Linz
 Men's Singles:  Liang Jingkun
 Women's Singles:  Chen Meng
 Men's Doubles:  (Masataka Morizono & Yuya Oshima)
 Women's Doubles:  (Hina Hayata & Mima Ito)

World Tour events
 January 18 – 21: 2018 Hungarian Open in  Budapest
 Men's Singles:  Fan Zhendong
 Women's Singles:  Wang Manyu
 Men's Doubles:  (Fan Zhendong & YU Ziyang)
 Women's Doubles:  (CHEN Xingtong & SUN Yingsha)
 May 24 – 27: 2018 Hong Kong Open in 
 Men's Singles:  Kazuhiro Yoshimura
 Women's Singles:  Wang Manyu
 Men's Doubles:  (Ho Kwan Kit & Wong Chun Ting)
 Women's Doubles:  (CHEN Xingtong & SUN Yingsha)
 June 8 – 10: 2018 Japan Open in  Kitakyushu
 Men's Singles:  Tomokazu Harimoto
 Women's Singles:  Mima Ito
 Men's Doubles:  (Jung Young-sik & Lee Sang-su)
 Women's Doubles:  (Gu Yuting & Mu Zi)
 August 16 – 19: 2018 Bulgaria Open in  Panagyurishte
 Men's Singles:  Xu Xin
 Women's Singles:  Ding Ning
 Men's Doubles:  (Ma Long & Xu Xin)
 Women's Doubles:  (Kasumi Ishikawa & Mima Ito)
 August 23 – 26: 2018 Czech Open in  Olomouc
 Men's Singles:  ZHENG Peifeng
 Women's Singles:  Kasumi Ishikawa
 Men's Doubles:  Patrick Franziska &  Jonathan Groth
 Women's Doubles:  (Liu Gaoyang & Zhang Rui)
 November 1 – 4: Swedish Open (final) in  Stockholm
 Men's Singles:  Fan Zhendong
 Women's Singles:  Mima Ito
 Men's Doubles:  (LIAO Cheng-Ting & LIN Yun-Ju)
 Women's Doubles:  (CHEN Xingtong & SUN Yingsha)

Grand Finals
 December 13 – 16: 2018 ITTF World Tour Grand Finals in  Incheon
 Men's Singles:  Tomokazu Harimoto
 Women's Singles:  Chen Meng
 Men's Doubles:  (JANG Woo-jin & LIM Jong-hoon)
 Women's Doubles:  (Hina Hayata & Mima Ito)
 Mixed Doubles:  (Wong Chun Ting & Doo Hoi Kem

2018 ITTF Challenge Series
 March 13 – 17: Polish Open in  Spała
 Men's Singles:  LIM Jong-hoon
 Women's Singles:  Yang Ha-eun
 Men's Doubles:  (Jung Young-sik & Lee Sang-su)
 Women's Doubles:  (Jeon Ji-hee & Yang Ha-eun)
 March 28 – April 1: Spanish Open in  Guadalajara
 Men's Singles:  KIM Min-hyeok
 Women's Singles:  Saki Shibata
 Men's Doubles:  (AN Jae-hyun & CHO Seung-min)
 Women's Doubles:  (Honoka Hashimoto & Hitomi Satō)
 April 2 – 6: Slovenia Open in  Otočec
 Men's Singles:  Mizuki Oikawa
 Women's Singles:  Miyu Kato
 Men's Doubles:  (Marek Badowski & Patryk Zatowka)
 Women's Doubles:  (NG Wing Nam & Minnie Wai-Yam SOO)
 April 10 – 14: Croatia Open in  Zagreb
 Men's Singles:  Panagiotis Gionis
 Women's Singles:  Saki Shibata
 Men's Doubles:  (Adam Szudi & Nandor Ecseki)
 Women's Doubles:  (Honoka Hashimoto & Hitomi Satō)
 May 16 – 20: Thailand Open in  Bangkok
 Men's Singles:  XU Ruifeng
 Women's Singles:  Liu Shiwen
 Men's Doubles:  (Tobias Hippler & Kilian Ort)
 Women's Doubles:  (Orawan Paranang & Suthasini Sawettabut)
 June 13 – 17: DPR Korea Open in  Pyongyang
 Men's Singles:  PAK Sin-hyok
 Women's Singles:  Kim Song-i
 Men's Doubles:  (JI Jiale & LIU Yebo)
 Women's Doubles:  (CHA Hyo-sim & KIM Nam-hae)
 August 8 – 12: Nigeria Open in  Lagos
 Men's Singles:  Quadri Aruna
 Women's Singles:  Guo Yan
 Men's Doubles:  (Alexandre Robinot & Joe Seyfried)
 Women's Doubles:  (QI Fenjie & SUN Chen)
 October 23 – 27: Belgium Open in  De Haan
 Men's Singles:  PARK Gang-hyeon
 Women's Singles:  Saki Shibata
 Men's Doubles:  (AN Jae-hyun & CHO Seung-min)
 Women's Doubles:  (Satsuki Odo & Saki Shibata)
 November 13 – 18: Belarus Open (final) in  Minsk
 Men's Singles:  ZHAO Zihao
 Women's Singles:  Saki Shibata
 Men's Doubles:  (Kakeru Sone & Yuta Tanaka)
 Women's Doubles:  (Satsuki Odo & Saki Shibata)

2018 ITTF World Junior Circuit

Golden Series events
 May 9 – 13: Thailand Junior & Cadet Open in  Bangkok

 Junior Boys' Singles:  KUANG Li
 Junior Girls' Singles:  HUANG Fanzhen

 Cadet Boys' Singles:  XIANG Peng
 Cadet Girls' Singles:  CHEN Yi

 July 4 – 8: China Junior & Cadet Open in  Taicang

 Junior Boys' Singles:  Kakeru Sone
 Junior Girls' Singles:  SHI Xunyao

 Cadet Boys' Singles:  Hiroto Shinozuka
 Cadet Girls' Singles:  KUAI Man

 August 1 – 5: Hong Kong Junior & Cadet Open in 

 Junior Boys' Singles:  XU Haidong
 Junior Girls' Singles:  SHI Xunyao
 Junior Boys' Doubles:  (Kazuki Hamada & Hiroto Shinozuka)
 Junior Girls' Doubles:  (QIAN Tianyi & SHI Xunyao)

 Cadet Boys' Singles:  XIANG Peng
 Cadet Girls' Singles:  CHEN Yi
 Cadet Boys' Doubles:  (XIANG Peng & ZENG Beixun)
 Cadet Girls' Doubles:  (CHEN Yi & LI Yuqi)

 August 22 – 26: Chinese Taipei Junior & Cadet Open (final) in  Taipei

 Junior Boys' Singles:  LI Hsin-Yang
 Junior Girls' Singles:  BYUN Seo-young
 Junior Boys' Doubles:  (FENG Yi-Hsin & LI Hsin-Yang)
 Junior Girls' Doubles:  (CHIEN Tung-Chuan & YU Hsiu-Ting)

 Cadet Boys' Singles:  Radin Khayyam
 Cadet Girls' Singles:  BYUN Seo-young
 Cadet Boys' Doubles:  (HUANG Yan-Cheng & LI Hsin-Yu)
 Cadet Girls' Doubles:  (SER Lin Qian & ZHOU Jingyi)

Premium events
 February 7 – 11: Oman Junior & Cadet Open in  Muscat

 Junior Boys' Singles:  YUAN Licen
 Junior Girls' Singles:  ZHANG Binyue

 Cadet Boys' Singles:  XIANG Peng
 Cadet Girls' Singles:  LI Yuqi

 February 14 – 18: Czech Junior & Cadet Open in  Hodonín

 Junior Boys' Singles:  YU Heyi
 Junior Girls' Singles:  SHI Xunyao
 Junior Boys' Doubles:  (XU Yingbin & YU Heyi)
 Junior Girls' Doubles:  (SHI Xunyao & SUN Yizhen)

 Cadet Boys' Singles:  KUANG Li
 Cadet Girls' Singles:  CHEN Yi
 Cadet Boys' Doubles:  (KUANG Li & ZENG Beixun)
 Cadet Girls' Doubles:  (Honami Nakamori & Sakura Yokoi)

 March 21 – 25: Italy Junior & Cadet Open in  Lignano

 Junior Boys' Singles:  XU Haidong
 Junior Girls' Singles:  QIAN Tianyi
 Junior Boys' Doubles:  (YU Heyi & YUAN Licen)
 Junior Girls' Doubles:  (HUANG Fanzhen & QIAN Tianyi)

 Cadet Boys' Singles:  XIANG Peng
 Cadet Girls' Singles:  CHEN Yi
 Cadet Boys' Doubles:  (KUANG Li & XIANG Peng)
 Cadet Girls' Doubles:  Elizabet Abraamian &  Elena Zaharia 

 April 25 – 29: French Junior & Cadet Open in  Metz

 Junior Boys' Singles:  YU Heyi
 Junior Girls' Singles:  ZHANG Binyue
 Junior Boys' Doubles:  (XU Yingbin & YU Heyi)
 Junior Girls' Doubles:  (SHI Xunyao &  SUN Yizhen)

 Cadet Boys' Singles:  XIANG Peng
 Cadet Girls' Singles:  YANG Yiyun
 Cadet Boys' Doubles:  (KUANG Li & XIANG Peng)
 Cadet Girls' Doubles:  (Kaho Akae & Yukari Sugasawa)

 May 23 – 27: Polish Junior & Cadet Open in  Władysławowo

 Junior Boys' Singles:  XIANG Peng
 Junior Girls' Singles:  SHI Xunyao
 Junior Boys' Doubles:  (Cristian Pletea & Rares Sipos)
 Junior Girls' Doubles:  (QIAN Tianyi & SHI Xunyao)

 Cadet Boys' Singles:  XIANG Peng
 Cadet Girls' Singles:  Yukari Sugasawa
 Cadet Boys' Doubles:  (KUANG Li & XIANG Peng)
 Cadet Girls' Doubles:  (Kaho Akae & Yukari Sugasawa)

 September 12 – 16: Croatia Junior & Cadet Open in  Varaždin

 Junior Boys' Singles:  GENG Linyu
 Junior Girls' Singles:  ZUO Yue
 Junior Boys' Doubles:  (GENG Linyu & SONG Zhuoheng)
 Junior Girls' Doubles:  (LI Ruonan & ZUO Yue)

 Cadet Boys' Singles:  CHEN Yuanyu
 Cadet Girls' Singles:  KUAI Man
 Cadet Boys' Doubles:  (LI Hsin-Yu & WANG Guan-Ru)
 Cadet Girls' Doubles:  (HUANG Yu-Jie & TSAI Yun-En)

 November 7 – 11: Hungarian Junior & Cadet Open (final) in  Szombathely

 Junior Boys' Singles:  LIU Yebo
 Junior Girls' Singles:  WU Yangchen
 Junior Boys' Doubles:  (Maksim Grebnev & Lev Katsman)
 Junior Girls' Doubles:  (WU Yangchen & ZANG Xiaotong)

 Cadet Boys' Singles:  HUANG Youzheng
 Cadet Girls' Singles:  CHEN Yi
 Cadet Boys' Doubles:  (HUANG Yan-Cheng & LI Yan Jun)
 Cadet Girls' Doubles:  (CHEN Yi & LI Yuqi)

Regular events
 February 21 – 25: Swedish Junior & Cadet Open in  Örebro

 Junior Boys' Singles:  Truls Moregard
 Junior Girls' Singles:  Yumento Soma
 Junior Boys' Doubles:  (Aoto Sazu & Takeru Kashiwa)
 Junior Girls' Doubles:  Camille Lutz &  Celia Silva

 Cadet Boys' Singles:  Theo Abrahamsson
 Cadet Girls' Singles:  Prithika Pavade

 March 19 – 23: Tunisia Junior & Cadet Open in  Soliman

 Junior Boys' Singles:  Amin Ahmadian
 Junior Girls' Singles:  Sabina Šurjan
 Junior Boys' Doubles:  Csaba Andras &  Jeremy Hazin
 Junior Girls' Doubles:  (Lucie Gauthier & Leili Mostafavi)

 Cadet Boys' Singles:  LIU Menglong
 Cadet Girls' Singles:  Radmila Tominjak
 Cadet Boys' Doubles:  (Aadil Anand & Payas Jain)
 Cadet Girls' Doubles:  (Roa Amro & Farida Badawy)

 April 1 – 5: Côte d'Ivoire Junior & Cadet Open in  Abidjan

 Junior Boys' Singles:  Youssef Abdel-Aziz
 Junior Girls' Singles:  CHEN Junjin
 Junior Boys' Doubles:  (Youssef Abdel-Aziz & Ahmed El-Borhamy)
 Junior Girls' Doubles:  (CHEN Junjin & LIN Lequan)

 Cadet Boys' Singles:  Ziad Elshawa
 Cadet Girls' Singles:  CHEN Junjin
 Cadet Boys' Doubles:  (Jean-Pierre Bayala & Ange Michel Seri)
 Cadet Girls' Doubles:  (CHEN Junjin & LIN Lequan)

 April 9 – 13: Paraguay Junior & Cadet Open in  Asunción

 Junior Boys' Singles:  Guilherme Teodoro
 Junior Girls' Singles:  Valentina Rios

 Cadet Boys' Singles:  Carlos Fernandez
 Cadet Girls' Singles:  Natasha Ruiz

 April 18 – 22: Belgium Junior & Cadet Open in  Spa

 Junior Boys' Singles:  Ioannis Sgouropoulos
 Junior Girls' Singles:  Yukari Sugasawa
 Junior Boys' Doubles:  (Aoto Asazu & Takeru Kashiwa)
 Junior Girls' Doubles:  (LEE Ka Yee & WONG Chin Yau)

 Cadet Boys' Singles:  Arnau Pons
 Cadet Girls' Singles:  Yukari Sugasawa
 Cadet Boys' Doubles:  (Felix Lebrun & Fabio Rakotoarimanana)
 Cadet Girls' Doubles:  (Kaho Akae & Yukari Sugasawa)

 May 9 – 13: Spanish Junior & Cadet Open in  Castell-Platja d'Aro

 Junior Boys' Singles:  Vladimir Sidorenko
 Junior Girls' Singles:  ZUO Yue
 Junior Boys' Doubles:  (Maksim Grebnev & Lev Katsman)
 Junior Girls' Doubles:  Zdena Blaskova &  Jamila Laurenti

 Cadet Boys' Singles:  Myshaal Sabhi
 Cadet Girls' Singles:  YANG Shilu
 Cadet Boys' Doubles:  (Ethan Claude & Myshaal Sabhi)
 Cadet Girls' Doubles:  (XIE Jiatong & YANG Shilu)

 May 17 – 20: Slovak Junior Open in  Senec

 Junior Boys' Singles:  Samuel Kulczycki
 Junior Girls' Singles:  WANG Xiaotong
 Junior Boys' Doubles:  Maciej Kolodziejczyk &  Cedric Meissner
 Junior Girls' Doubles:  (WANG Xiaotong & WEI Yuanhui)

 May 28 – 31: Canada Junior & Cadet Open in  Markham, Ontario

 Junior Boys' Singles:  SUN Zheng
 Junior Girls' Singles:  Anna Wegrzyn

 Cadet Boys' Singles:  Edward Ly
 Cadet Girls' Singles:  Lavanya Maruthapandian

 June 4 – 7: Cook Islands Junior & Cadet Open in  Rarotonga

 Junior Boys' Singles:  PANG Yew En Koen
 Junior Girls' Singles:  DAI Tian
 Junior Boys' Doubles:  Owen Cathcart &  Laurens Devos
 Junior Girls' Doubles:  (DAI Tian & YANG Hangguo)

 Cadet Boys' Singles:  Jacobo Vahnish
 Cadet Girls' Singles:  Parleen Kaur
 Cadet Boys' Doubles:  (PARK Sang-Yong & Nathan Xu)
 Cadet Girls' Doubles:  (Filomena & Loata Duncan)

 July 25 – 29: Jordan Junior & Cadet Open in  Amman

 Junior Boys' Singles:  LI Hsin-Yang
 Junior Girls' Singles:  CHEN Ting-Ting
 Junior Boys' Doubles:  (Amirreza Abbasi & Amin Ahmadian)
 Junior Girls' Doubles:  (CAI Fong-En & CHEN Ting-Ting)

 Cadet Boys' Singles:  LI Hsin-Yu
 Cadet Girls' Singles:  SUI Xiaoran
 Cadet Boys' Doubles:  (Deepit Patil & Dev Shroff)
 Cadet Girls' Doubles:  (SUI Xiaoran & ZHANG Yulei)

 August 15 – 19: El Salvador Junior & Cadet Open in  San Salvador

 Junior Boys' Singles:  TAI Ming-Wei
 Junior Girls' Singles:  FANG Sih-Han
 Junior Boys' Doubles:  (KAO Min-Chi & TAI Ming-Wei)
 Junior Girls' Doubles:  (FANG Sih-Han & TSAI Yu-Chin)

 Cadet Boys' Singles:  WANG Chen-You
 Cadet Girls' Singles:  CHEN Tsai-Ni
 Cadet Boys' Doubles:  (WANG Chen-You & YANG Tsan-Wei)
 Cadet Girls' Doubles:  (CHEN Tsai-Ni & LIU Ru-Yun)

 September 19 – 23: Serbia Junior & Cadet Open in  Belgrade

 Junior Boys' Singles:  ZENG Beixun
 Junior Girls' Singles:  Jinnipa Sawettabut
 Junior Boys' Doubles:  Yanapong Panagitgun &  Gerald Zong Jun Yu
 Junior Girls' Doubles:  Eunice Lim &  Jinnipa Sawettabut

 Cadet Boys' Singles:  Payas Jain
 Cadet Girls' Singles:  LI Zeyan
 Cadet Boys' Doubles:  (LIU Shuanghao & XU Haotian)
 Cadet Girls' Doubles:  (DING Zige & ZHANG Yunhan)

 October 24 – 28: Egypt Junior & Cadet Open in  Sharm El Sheikh

 Junior Boys' Singles:  DING Shixian
 Junior Girls' Singles:  Ekaterina Zironova
 Junior Boys' Doubles:  (Youssef Abdel-Aziz & Marwan Abdelwahab)
 Junior Girls' Doubles:  (WANG Yidan & ZHOU Bingru)

 Cadet Boys' Singles:  Radu Andrei Miron
 Cadet Girls' Singles:  Ilona Sztwiertnia
 Cadet Boys' Doubles:  (Dragos Alexandru Bujor & Radu Andrei Miron)
 Cadet Girls' Doubles:  Farida Badawy &  Malamatenia Papadimitriou

 November 2 – 4: Slovak Cadet Open in  Bratislava
 Cadet Boys' Singles:  CHEN Yifei
 Cadet Girls' Singles:  XU Yi
 Cadet Boys' Doubles:  (NIU Zeqian & ZHANG Jinghan)
 Cadet Girls' Doubles:  (SUN Xiaomeng & XU Yi)
 November 27 – 30: Portugal Junior & Cadet Open (final)  Guimarães

 Junior Boys' Singles:  Manav Vikash Thakkar
 Junior Girls' Singles:  LIU Yangzi
 Junior Boys' Doubles:  (Manush Utpalbhai Shah & Manav Vikash Thakkar)
 Junior Girls' Doubles:  (QIN Xiaoce & XIN Chenglin)

 Cadet Boys' Singles:  XIONG Mengyang
 Cadet Girls' Singles:  WANG Xinyu
 Cadet Boys' Doubles:  (Ivor Ban & Lovro Zovko)
 Cadet Girls' Doubles:  (Ines Matos & Patricia Santos)

See also
International Table Tennis Federation
2018 in sports

References

External links
International Table Tennis Federation
European Table Tennis Union
Asian Table Tennis Union

 
Table tennis by year
2018 sport-related lists